San Benedetto Val di Sambro is a comune (municipality) in the Metropolitan City of Bologna in the Italian region Emilia-Romagna, located about  southwest of Bologna.

The Italicus Express bombing and the Train 904 bombing happened at this location.

References

External links

 Official website

Cities and towns in Emilia-Romagna